Hari Kostov (born November 13, 1959 in s. Pishica Probištip) is a Macedonian politician who served as the Prime Minister of Macedonia from May 2004 until his resignation in November 2004.

He was appointed to the position of Prime Minister by the parliament on May 31, 2004, two weeks after being nominated by President Branko Crvenkovski. Kostov was an economic advisor to the Macedonian government and the World Bank during the 1980s and 1990s. He was the interior minister in the previous government, which was led by Crvenkovski and lasted from 2002 until 2004, and ended when Crvenkovski was elected president. Kostov retained most officials from the Crvenkovski government.

Kostov announced his resignation on November 15, 2004, following disputes within the coalition government, particularly between ethnic Macedonian and ethnic Albanian ministers. He left office on November 18, 2004, when his resignation was accepted, and was succeeded by the defence minister, Vlado Bučkovski.

Currently, he is chief executive of the Komercijalna Bank Skopje (Комерцијална Банка Скопје), a position which he also had before entering the Macedonian government.

Kostov is an ethnic Aromanian.

Awards
   (2008) Order of the Holy Macedonian Cross

References

1959 births
Living people
People from Probištip Municipality
Social Democratic Union of Macedonia politicians
Prime Ministers of North Macedonia
Macedonian businesspeople
Macedonian bankers
Macedonian people of Aromanian descent
Aromanian politicians